Facundo Andrés Affranchino (born 9 February 1990) is an Argentine footballer currently playing for Club Olimpo.

Career

Affranchino made his debut as a 16-year-old on November 10, 2007 in a River Plate's 2-1 away loss to Huracán where he played 81 minutes as a right winger.

Affranchino was part of the squad that won the Clausura 2008 tournament, but he did not actually feature in any of the games.

In the 2010 Clausura, Affranchino entered and scored his first goal for River against San Lorenzo, giving River a 1-0.

In the 2010 Apertura, he scored his second goal for the club against Huracan in the second round. River won the match 1-0 thanks to his goal.

References

External links 
 
 River player's stats on Argentinesoccer.com
 Argentine Primera statistics 
 

1990 births
Living people
Argentine footballers
Argentine expatriate footballers
People from Paraná, Entre Ríos
Argentine sportspeople of Italian descent
Association football midfielders
Sportspeople from Entre Ríos Province
Club Atlético River Plate footballers
San Martín de San Juan footballers
Club Atlético Belgrano footballers
Unión de Santa Fe footballers
Ferro Carril Oeste footballers
Instituto footballers
Lobos BUAP footballers
Villa Dálmine footballers
C.D. Olmedo footballers
Olimpo footballers
Argentine Primera División players
Primera Nacional players
Ascenso MX players
Expatriate footballers in Ecuador
Expatriate footballers in Mexico
Argentine expatriate sportspeople in Ecuador
Argentine expatriate sportspeople in Mexico